Sally Smart (born 1960) is an Australian contemporary artist known for her large-scale assemblage installations that incorporate a range of media, including felt cut-outs, painted canvas, drawings, screen-printing, printed fabric and photography, performance and video. Her art addresses gender and identity politics and questions the relationships between body and culture, including trans-national ideas that shaped cultural history. She has exhibited widely throughout Australia and internationally, and her works are held in major galleries in Australia and around the world.

Early life and education 
Smart was born in 1960, in Quorn, South Australia. Her great-aunt was Bessie Davidson, an Australian-born artist whose success in France in the first half of the twentieth century encouraged Smart in her determination to become an artist. Smart obtained a Diploma in Graphic Design from the South Australian School of Art, Adelaide in 1981,
 and completed a Post-graduate Diploma in Painting at the Victorian College of the Arts, Melbourne (1988), followed by a Master of Fine Arts in 1991, also at the Victorian College of the Arts.

Work 
Smart's early work reflected the influence of Collage in painting in Australian art during the 1980s. By the 1990s, "cutting and pasting ha[d] come to the fore" in Smart's work, and she was creating "composition[s] of cut-out shapes [that] meander[] over the walls".

The themes of gender and identity were central to Smart's work from the beginning. Her 1996/1997 work, The Unhomely Body, reflects in its title "the idea of something being unsettling because it contains the familiar rendered unfamiliar, through the emergence of what was previously suppressed. Here the domestic environment is acknowledged as the historical site of female confinement." In her work Femmage Shadows and Symptoms (1999 and later), Smart used the word femmage, created by feminist Miriam Schapiro, to explicitly link to historic traditions of women's making in many mediums and techniques, and feminist political discussions of such women's work, with this large-scale installation "creating a surrealistic, dream-like pattern in which the viewer can discover suggestive images that are likely to trigger memories of childhood impressions". In this work, the themes of the home and inner emotions were further developed and exposed, represented also by Smart dressing herself in a costume made up of women's internal body parts.

From 2006, Smart exhibited her Exquisite Pirate installation series internationally. One critic considered the name "a good analogy for Smart’s approach to making art", partly referencing the surrealist technique exquisite corpse, and also implying a strategy of breaking rules for profit, or, "In this case, for stunning visual invention, where phantasmagorical apparitions appear, wreak havoc and disappear into a sea of detail". Another reviewer perceived "a mass of fragments that are forever being reordered and rearranged to forge new meanings and modes of understanding .... Smart explores and eloquently articulates the complexities of these processes".

In her most recent installations, The Choreography of Cutting (The Pedagogical Puppet Projects), Smart "investigat[es] .. three seemingly disparate topics: the historical Avant-Garde, traditional Indonesian folk art and the act of cutting", exploring links between the costume designs of the early 20th century Ballets Russes and traditional Javanese puppetry. Designs were digitally cut up and rearranged, quotes from Gertrude Stein, Pina Bausch, Rudolph von Laban and others were "metaphorically ... ‘cut’ from their original contexts" and "scrawled" over two walls, "us[ing] a process that necessitated the entire body: reaching, bending and moving across the length and height of the canvas: [Smart] has inevitably acted out the topic of investigation". Video works were also incorporated, choreographing puppets and shadows.

Hawker has described how Smart's "art reflects the subversive nature of the Avant-garde in women's art practice. Questions of gender and identity are key concerns in her work, and Smart seek particular inspiration from, and engages with, early twentieth-century innovative modernist women artists."

Smart has exhibited internationally, including at the Singapore Art Museum, Singapore; Wooyang Museum of Contemporary Art, Korea; Galeri Canna, Jakarta; Fukuoka Art Museum, Japan; Dark Heart: 2014 Adelaide Biennial of Australian Art, Art Gallery of South Australia, Adelaide; The Pedagogical Puppet Contemporary Galleries, University of Connecticut, USA; Herbert F. Johnson Museum of Art, Cornell University, New York; and Iberia Center for Contemporary Art, Beijing, China.

Smart lives and works Melbourne, Victoria.

Recognition and awards
Redlands Westpac Art Prize, Sydney (2004)
Sackler Fellow Artist-in Residence, University of Connecticut, USA (2012)
 Australia Council Fellowship (2014)
Vice-Chancellor’s Fellow at the University of Melbourne (2017)

Other roles
Trustee at the National Gallery of Victoria from 2001 to 2008.
Board member (Deputy Chair) at the National Association for the Visual Arts (NAVA) from 2016 to 2019.

Selected exhibitions

Solo exhibitions (selection) 
Smart has exhibited extensively throughout Australia and internationally, including China, United States, Belgium, Hong Kong, Brazil, New Zealand, Spain and Japan.
 The Unhomely Body
 1996, Contemporary Art Centre of South Australia, Adelaide, Australia
 1997, Robert Lindsay Gallery, Melbourne, Australia
 Femmage Shadows and Symptoms
 1999, Fukuoka Art Museum, Fukuoka, Japan
 2001, G2 Gallery Auckland New Zealand
 2010, McClelland Gallery + Sculpture Park, Langwarrin, Australia
 Shadow Farm
 2000, Wollongong City Gallery, Wollongong
 2000, Monash University Museum of Art, Melbourne
 2001, Bendigo Art Gallery, Bendigo
 2002, Bond University Gallery, Gold Coast
 2002, Queensland University of Technology, Brisbane
 Family Tree House, 2001, Galeria Barro Senna Sao Paulo, Brazil
 Sally Smart, 2003, Kalli Rolfe Contemporary Art, Melbourne
 The Exquisite Pirate
 2006, Postmasters Gallery, New York
 2006, Greenaway Art Gallery, Adelaide
 2006, Dangerous Waters: Cornell University, Herbert F. Johnson Museum of Art, Ithaca, New York
 2007, Yawk, Yawk: 24HR Art, Darwin, NT, Australia
 2007, North Sea: Ter Caemer-Meert Contemporary, Kortrijk, Belgium
 2008, Installation, Scope Basel, Basel, Switzerland
 2009, South China Sea: OV Gallery, Shanghai, China
 2012, Purdy Hicks Gallery, London, UK
 Decoy Nest
 2008, Postmasters Gallery, New York
 2011, Greenaway Art Gallery, Melbourne, Australia
 Flaubert’s Puppets, 2011, Postmasters Gallery, New York, NY, USA
 Performativities (Work On Paper), 2011, Amelia Johnson Contemporary, Hong Kong, China
 The Log Dance (In Her Nature)
 2011, Breenspace, Sydney, Australia
 2012, ArtHK 2012, Amelia Johnson Contemporary, Hong Kong, China
 I Build My Time, 2012, Fehitly Contemporary, Melbourne, Australia
 Choreographing Collage, 2013, Breenspace Sydney, Australia
 The Choreography of Cutting (The Pedagogical Puppet Projects)
 2013, Greenaway Art Gallery, Adelaide, Australia
 2015, Purdy Hicks Gallery, London, UK
 2016, Postmasters Gallery, New York
 2017, Sarah Scout Presents, Melbourne, Australia
 2018, Tony Raka Art Gallery, Ubud, and P.A.R.A.D.E. at BIASA, Kerobokan, Indonesia
 The Shadow Trees Sculpture Installation, 2014, Victoria Harbour, Docklands, Melbourne, Australia

Group exhibitions (selection) 
 2015–2016 Conversation: Endless Acts in Human History, National Gallery of Indonesia
 2013 COLLECTIVE IDENTITY(IeS): THIS IS THAT TIME – Lake Macquarie City Art Gallery
 2012 Contemporary Australia: Women – Gallery of Modern Art, Queensland
 2002 Arid Arcadia: art of the Flinders Ranges, Art Gallery of South Australia
 1998 Unhomely, Wooyang Museum of Contemporary Art, Korea

Collections 
 National Gallery of Australia, Canberra
 National Gallery of Victoria, Melbourne
 Art Gallery of South Australia, Adelaide
 GOMA/Queensland Art Gallery, Brisbane
 Museum of Contemporary Art, Sydney
 Auckland Art Gallery, Toi o Tamaki, Auckland, New Zealand
 Herbert F. Johnson Museum, Cornell University, New York, USA
 British Museum, London, UK

References

External links 

1960 births
Australian artists
Australian women artists
Artists from South Australia
People from Melbourne
Living people
Victorian College of the Arts alumni